Hoa Pham is an Australian author of Vietnamese descent.

Biography
Pham was born in Hobart after her parents arrived there during the 1970s to study.  She lives in Melbourne.

Pham's most recent novel is The Lady of the Realm, published in 2017. Her novel The Other Shore was a co-winner of Seizure's Viva la Novella 2 competition. Her first novel, Vixen led her to win the 2001 Sydney Morning Herald's Young Writer of the Year award. Vixen also was a finalist for the 2000 Aurealis Award for best fantasy novel but lost to Juliet Marillier's Son of the Shadows. She was the founding editor of Peril, an online journal for Asian Australians.

Bibliography

Novels
Quicksilver (1998)
Vixen (2000)
The Other Shore (2014)
Wave (2015)
Lady of the Realm (2017)
Empathy (2022)

Children's books
 No-one Like Me (1998)
 49 Ghosts (1998)

Short stories
"Reality" (1994) in Aurealis #13, (ed. Stephen Higgins, Dirk Strasser)
"On the Continent" (1998) in Aurealis #20/21 (ed. Stephen Higgins, Dirk Strasser)
 Yolk (2007)
 Heroic Mother (2008)
 Immolation
 Mara

Plays
 Silence (2008–2010): about the secrets and spirits that haunt us from within. A family reunited by a death anniversary have to face the possessiveness of history and put the past to rest.  Silence is on the Victorian Certificate of Education list for drama in 2010.  Silence was presented at [La Mama Theatre (Melbourne)] in 2008, 2009 and 2010.
 I could be you (2009–2010): a short ten-minute play in the Melburnalia 2 series in 2009, and will be expanded into a full-length play for the Melbourne Fringe Festival in 2010.

References

External links
 Hoa Pham's web site
 Peril: A Journal for Asian Australians

Australian people of Vietnamese descent
Australian women writers
Australian writers
Living people
Year of birth missing (living people)
People from Hobart
People from Melbourne